The glissomonads are a group of bacterivorous gliding flagellated protists that compose the order Glissomonadida, in the amoeboflagellate phylum Cercozoa. They comprise a vast, largely undescribed diversity of soil and freshwater organisms. They are the sister group to cercomonads; the two orders form a solid clade of gliding soil-dwelling flagellates called Pediglissa.

Morphology

External appearance
Glissomonads are zooflagellates that aren't strongly amoeboid, and are only covered by a plasma membrane. Their common ancestor is thought to be a biflagellate, with a short anterior flagellum and a long posterior flagellum, that glided on the substrate by moving their posterior flagellum. In gliding descendants, the cell's posterior zone is usually rounded, giving the cell an ovoid shape. Some species may temporarily extend a protoplasmic tail, that unlike most cercomonads doesn't trail along the posterior flagellum. At least two genera, Orciraptor and Viridiraptor, are capable of transforming into a distinctly amoeboid state attached to the surface.

The group also includes descendants that have lost their gliding, mainly Proleptomonas. This genus has another exception to the group: an anterior flagellum that is longer than the posterior, while the posterior is adherent to the cell and not used for gliding.

Internal structure
Most species lack obvious morphological specializations: there is no cytopharynx, deep flagellar groove, or pocket evident. Apart from Proleptomonas, which is exceptionally elongated and has a modified cytoskeleton, the nucleus is usually anterior and attached to the kinetid (= flagellar apparatus) through well-developed fibrous roots. There are typically two posterior and one anterior microtubular centriolar roots. A contractile vacuole is usually seen in the cell's posterior area. The mitochondria have tubular cristae. There is a microbody attached to the posterior side of the nucleus, except in Proleptomonas. The Golgi apparatus is usually seen associated with the nucleus, which doesn't happen in all cercozoans.

Both flagella have the same thickness and are simple, without a paraxonemal rod, hairs or scales, sometimes acronematic (= with an acroneme). Unlike in cercomonads, the ciliary transition zone has a dense transverse plate at the distal end. The anterior flagellum beats like a cilium towards the left, as seen in cercomonads, and is sometimes reduced to a short stub without an axoneme.

Ecology and behavior
Glissomonads are heterotrophic aerobic organisms that almost exclusively inhabit soil or freshwater, where they feed on bacteria. Sexual reproduction is unknown. Cysts are present in the group, and have smooth walls.

Phylogeny
The cladogram below depicts the evolutionary relationships between most of the glissomonad families:

Classification
The current classification is:
Family Saccharomycomorphidae 
Suborder Allapsina 
Family Allapsidae 
Allapsa 
Allantion 
Teretomonas 
Suborder Sandonina 
Family Dujardinidae 
Dujardina 
Family Bodomorphidae 
Bodomorpha 
Family Sandonidae 
Flectomonas 
Mollimonas 
Neoheteromita 
Sandona 
Family Proleptomonadidae 
Proleptomonas 
Suborder Pansomonadina 
Family Viridiraptoridae 
Viridiraptor 
Orciraptor 
Family Agitatidae 
Agitata 
Family Acinetactidae 
Acinetactis 
Family Aurigamonadidae 
Aurigamonas

References

External links

Cercozoa orders